Elematic Oyj is a Finnish company founded in 1959. It supplies production technology, machinery, equipment, software and knowhow for precast concrete industry worldwide. It is a precast concrete machinery manufacturer.  90% of its products were exported in 2019.

The company has an assembly unit in Akaa, Finland and engineering workshops in Riihimäki, Finland, Alwar, India, and Changzhou, China.

History

1959-1972 (Toijalan Teräsvalmiste)
In 1959 Toijalan Teräsvalmiste (TTV) was founded by brothers Pentti and Pauli Virtanen. The company started to manufacture equipment and machinery for precast concrete industry. From early on the company was interested in international markets and in 1969 a German subsidiary Finn Elematic Baugeräte GmbH was founded in Nidda, near Frankfurt.

Elematic’s first hollow-core machine was completed in the beginning of 1970s. The company was sold to Paraisten Kalkki.

1973-1987 (Partek Heavy Metal Industry)
In 1973 Paraisten Kalkki and TTV merged forming Partek Heavy Metal Industry (later Heavy Mechanical Industry Division). At the same time Finn-Elematic GmbH continued marketing Elematic products in Germany and Central Europe. In 1975 Partek-Machines Ltd was established to manage company’s export activities.

Sales and design were split into separate business units in 1981: Toijalan Konepaja for manufacturing and Elematic Engineering for designing, sales and marketing. In 1984 Canadian Dy-Core Systems Inc was merged into Elematic Engineering Oy.

1988-1995 (Elematic Engineering Oy)
Partek’s divisions were officially separated when Elematic Engineering Oy was established in 1988 and Toijala Works Oy in 1989.

In 1990 Elematic Engineering Oy told that it was going to deliver a production unit to Soviet Union worth 30 million Finnish markkas. Saint Petersburg-based metal industry company Izhora ordered a factory manufacturing concrete elements for residential construction. Elematic’s turnover at that time was about 150 million Finnish markkas and it had business premises in Toijala, in Nidda, and in Vancouver, Canada. The company’s share of the world market in hollow-core slab technology was more than a half.

In 1992 along with the changes in the Finnish construction material industry, Partek and Lohja Parma Engineering, the leading companies in the field, merged their precast concrete production plants. Partek Concrete Engineering was created in early 1993.

1996-2002 (PCE Engineering Oy)

In 1996 Partek Concrete Engineering acquired German Roth Maschinenbau GmbH. With it the company received the slipforming trademark Roth. Partek Concrete Engineering became PCE Engineering Oy Ab (PCE). 

In 1998 a North American subsidiary PCE Elematic Inc was established. In 1999 Finnish mold and casting bed manufacturer Rimera Oy was merged into PCE. 

In 2001 Elematic acquired Acotec Ltd. With the transaction Acotec technology became a part of PCE’s product portfolio.

2003-2006 (Elematic Oy Ab)
In 2003 the company’s name was changed back to Elematic Oy Ab to unify it with the trademark Elematic. The company’s turnover was 35 million euros, of which 90 % was export. 

In 2004 Elematic acquired German Roteco GmbH. Roteco was one of the world’s leading slipformer manufacturers with turnover of 2 million euros. It had 15 employees. Elematic was part of Consolis Group, which was world’s leading supplier of machinery, equipment, production lines and complete plants for precast concrete industry. It had 150 employees in Finland, Germany and USA. 

In 2006 Partek sold Elematic to capital investors. In August 2006 Sentica Partners and a group of other investors bought Elematic from Consolis. In November Elematic bought Finnish hollow-core slab machinery manufacturer X-TEC Oy. Two thirds of the company’s turnover came from Middle East and Russian-speaking Eastern Europe.

2007-2014 (Elematic Group)
2007 investor group sold Elematic Group to a British private investor company Pamplona Capital Management. Elematic's management team retained its part of ownership. 

In 2012 the main owner of the company was British Pamplona Capital Management. Elematic received a big order to supply world’s largest precast plant in Iraq and recruited 50 new employees. It also delivered equipment for SBS Betoni’s new wall element plant in Mikkeli, Finland.

In 2013 Elematic told about a new order for delivery of complete precast plant to Minsk, Belarus. The value of the order was about 9 million euros. 95% of the company’s production was exported and although recession had slowed investments in the Western countries, the developing markets still had demand for Elematic's solutions.

In 2014 Elematic opened new production units in Akaa, Finland and in Alwar, India.

2015- (Elematic Oyj)
In 2015 Elematic Oy Ab changed its company type into public limited company, Elematic Plc (Elematic Oyj in Finnish). The change was related to the issuance of a secured bond.

In the early 2019 Elematic's main owners were Sampo and Robus Capital.

Organization

Elematic headquarters are located in Akaa, Finland. The company has four production units, an assembly unit in Akaa and engineering workshops in Riihimäki, Finland, Alwar, India. and Changzhou, China. 

Elematic also has subsidiaries:
Elematic GmbH, in Germany
Elematic Inc, in the USA
Elematic India Pvt Ltd in India 
Elematic Teeyer Construction Technology (Jiangsu) Co. Ltd  in China

In addition, the company has a customer service center in Dubai, Finland and USA, as well as agents and distributors in over 20 countries.

Products

Elematic designs, manufactures and supplies complete precast plants, machinery, equipment, and the related software for precast concrete industry. Precast concrete products that can be manufactured with Elematic's technology include hollow-core slabs, façade and partition walls, beams and columns, Acotec wall elements, piles, and TT-slabs.

Main technology or machinery sold by Elematic includes extruders, slipformers, circulation lines, battery molds, tilting tables, batching and mixing plants, and concrete transportations systems. In addition, Elematic’s product portfolio includes supporting equipment for precast concrete production, as well as Plant Control production control system and shuttering Fastening Method system.

References

External links
Company's web pages

Manufacturing companies of Finland